Mdhila is a town in the Gafsa Governorate, Tunisia. It constitutes a municipality with 12814 inhabitants in 2014.

See also
List of cities in Tunisia

References

Communes of Tunisia
Populated places in Gafsa Governorate
Tunisia geography articles needing translation from French Wikipedia